Channing is both a surname and a given name. Notable people with the name include:

Surname
 Carol Channing (1921–2019), American actress
 Chad Channing (born 1967), American drummer
 Edward Channing (1856–1931), American historian
 Edward Tyrrel Channing (1790–1856), American academic and lawyer
 Justin Andrew Channing (born 1968), English former footballer
 Neil Channing (born 1967), English poker player
 Stockard Channing (born 1944), American actress
 Walter Channing Jr. (1940–2015), American businessman
 Walter Channing (physician) (1786–1876), American physician
 Dr. William Ellery Channing (1780–1842), American Unitarian theologian
 William Ellery Channing (poet) (1818–1901), American poet
 William Henry Channing (1810–1884), American writer and philosopher

Given name
 Channing H. Cox (1879–1968), American politician
 Channing Crowder (born 1983), American football linebacker
 Channing Dungey (born 1969), American television executive, and producer
 Channing Frye (born 1983), American professional basketball player
 Channing Gibson, American television producer, and writer
 Channing Hill (born 1987), American jockey
 Channing D. Phillips (born 1958), attorney
 Channing E. Phillips (1928–1987), American activist and minister
 Channing Robertson, American chemical engineer
 Channing Stribling (born 1994), American football player
 Channing Tatum (born 1980), American actor
 Channing Heggie Tobias (1882–1961), American activist
 Channing Ward (born 1992), American football player
 Channing Moore Williams (1829–1910), Anglican bishop and saint
 Channing Wilroy (born 1940), American actor